Eucalyptus albida, commonly known as the white-leaved mallee, is a mallee that is endemic to the south-west of Western Australia. It has smooth white or greyish brown bark, lance shaped adult leaves, and flowers in groups of between seven and eleven. The flowers are creamy white and the fruit are hemispherical to cone-shaped. The juvenile leaves that are often retained on mature plants are arranged in opposite pairs, egg-shaped to heart-shaped and bluish grey.

Description
Juvenile leaves are often present on mature plants.

The flowers are creamy white.

Taxonomy
Eucalyptus albida was first formally described in 1925 by Joseph Maiden and William Blakely and the description was published in Journal and Proceedings of the Royal Society of New South Wales. The type specimen was collected near Harrismith by Charles Gardner. The specific epithet (albida) is taken from the Latin word albidus meaning "whitish" in reference to the colour of the juvenile leaves.

Distribution
White-leaved mallee grows in sand, often with gravel and over laterite, in kwongan and shrubland. It is found from Tammin and Narrogin east to Hyden and Ravensthorpe with a disjunct population near Badgingarra.

Conservation
This eucalypt is classified as "not threatened" by the Western Australian Government Department of Parks and Wildlife.

Uses
The juvenile leaves or coppice regrowth of this species is used by florists as a filler in dried flower arrangements and is referred to as rustle gum. The plant is drought and frost resistant in cultivation.

See also
List of Eucalyptus species

References

Eucalypts of Western Australia
Trees of Australia
albida
Myrtales of Australia
Plants described in 1925
Taxa named by Joseph Maiden
Taxa named by William Blakely